The Faculty of Arts of Pristina is the faculty of arts of the University of Pristina with temporary headquarters in Zvečan, North Kosovo, Kosovo..

History 

The Faculty was founded in Pristina in 1973 as the Academy of Arts and got the present name in 1986. During the Kosovo War of 1999 it was moved, first to Varvarin and later to Zvečan and Kosovska Mitrovica, where it is now. It is part of the University of Pristina, provisionally relocated to Kosovska Mitrovica.

Divisions 
Art
Music
Drama

Degrees offered

Acting 
Bachelor of Arts
Master of Arts

Music 
Bachelor of Arts, Bachelor of Music
Master of Arts, Master of Music

Visual arts 
Bachelor of Arts
Master of Arts

Academic staff

Notes and references
Notes

References

External links 

 
 Faculty's page at Infostud's website
 Faculty of Arts' page at the University of Pristina website
 Faculty 's page at Saatchi Gallery website
   List of Higher Education Institutions at the Ministry of Education  of the Republic of Serbia's website

1973 establishments in Serbia
Educational institutions established in 1973
Zvečan
Arts
North Mitrovica
North Kosovo
Zvečan